Richland Creek  is a stream in Bourbon and Crawford counties, in the U.S. state of Kansas.

Richland Creek was named for the fertility of their soil.

See also
List of rivers of Kansas

References

Rivers of Bourbon County, Kansas
Rivers of Crawford County, Kansas
Rivers of Kansas